Un amore e una vendetta is an Italian television series.

The eight episode series aired on the Canale 5 network from 12 October through 23 November 2011, and featured Anna Valle, Alessandro Preziosi, and Lorenzo Flaherty.  The series was first premiered at the 2011 Rome Fiction Fest at the Parco della Musica.

The television premiere on Canale 5 was watched by 4.4 million viewers for a 17.72% share, winning its time slot, and continuing to perform well throughout its run.

Based on the popular 2006 Argentine telenovela Montecristo (which was optioned to a number of countries, including Italy), the storyline is loosely based on The Count of Monte Cristo by Alexandre Dumas.

It was marketed as Love and Vendetta in English.

Cast 

Anna Valle: Laura Castellani
Alessandro Preziosi: Lorenzo Bermann/Andrea Damonte
Lorenzo Flaherty: Marco Damiani
Giovanni Guidelli: Paolo Bianchi
Paolo Seganti: Luca Calligaris
Federico Costantini: Massimiliano Bianchi
Elisabetta Pellini: Olga Bernardi
Ray Lovelock: Alberto Castellani
Simona Borioni: Gabriella Bianchi
Mohamed Zouaoui: Hassan
Desirèe Noferini: Kadisha
Fiorenza Marchegiani: Betta
Giulia Elettra Gorietti: Monica
Benedetta Massola: Stefania
Miloud Mourad Benamara: arab man on the beach

References

2011 Italian television series debuts
2010s Italian drama television series
2011 Italian television series endings
Canale 5 original programming